Ernest Elmer Bearg (July 20, 1893 – August 24, 1971) was an American football and basketball coach. He served as the head football coach at Washburn University from 1918 to 1919 and again from 1929 to 1935 and the University of Nebraska–Lincoln from 1925 to 1928, compiling a career college football record of 71–40–7. Bearg also spent one year as Nebraska's men's basketball coach (1925–1926) and posted an 8–10 mark. Before coming to Nebraska, he also served as an assistant coach at the University of Illinois at Urbana–Champaign under Robert Zuppke

Early life
Bearg was a 1916 graduate of Washburn University where he was a member of the Kansas Beta Chapter of Phi Delta Theta. During his senior year at Washburn, he was elected senior class president.

Coaching career

Washburn
Bearg was the 15th and then the 20th head football coach for the Washburn Ichabods. He first held the position for two seasons in 1918 and 1919 and again for seven more seasons from 1929 until 1935. Bearg's overall record at Washburn was 47–33–4.

After coaching for four seasons at Nebraska, Bearg led the Ichabods to a 36–31 record and the 1931 Central Intercollegiate Conference championship. Two of his team's three losses during the 1931 season came to the Kansas and Kansas State.

Nebraska
Under Bearg's leadership, Nebraska won its first Big Six Conference title in 1928 when his team went 7–1–1. The Cornhuskers were conference runners-up in 1926 and 1927 According to Nebraska's official athletics website, Bearg fielded powerful team during his four years at the helm but "fans criticized him for not using strategy and deception, which eventually led to his resignation." After four seasons in Lincoln, Bearg was replaced by future College Football Hall of Fame coach, Dana X. Bible.

Honors
Bearg was inducted into the Washburn Athletics Hall of Fame in 1973–74, and earned a spot as a coach in the Nebraska Football Hall of Fame in 1988.

Head coaching record

Football

References

External links
 

1893 births
1971 deaths
Basketball coaches from Kansas
Illinois Fighting Illini football coaches
Nebraska Cornhuskers football coaches
Nebraska Cornhuskers men's basketball coaches
Washburn Ichabods football coaches
Washburn University alumni
Washburn Ichabods athletic directors
People from Doniphan County, Kansas
Players of American football from Kansas